S300 may refer to:

Military and aviation
 S-300 missile system, a Soviet/Russian surface-to-air missile system
 HNoMS Ula (S300), a Royal Norwegian Navy submarine
 Schweizer 300, formerly Sikorsky S300, a family of light utility helicopters

Other uses
 Canon PowerShot S300, a camera
 Lotus Esprit S300, a car
 Mercedes Benz S-300, a car
 S300, a Sendo mobile phone model
 S300, a Victorian Railways S class steam locomotive of Australia

See also

 
 
 300 (disambiguation)
 300s (disambiguation)
 300 series (disambiguation), including Series 300